The Gandharvas was a Canadian alternative rock band formed in 1989 in London, Ontario.

History
The band formed in 1989 as The Droogs (later The London Droogs), and released a self-titled EP in 1991. They changed their name to The Gandharvas in 1993, after Gandharvas, who are musical spirits in Hinduism.

The band performed live shows in the London area, and in November 1993 signed with the label Watch Music. In 1994 the group released their debut album as The Gandharvas, titled A Soap Bubble and Inertia. The album included the single "The First Day of Spring", which was named Song of the Year (CASBY Award) by The Edge 102.1 in Toronto, and was nominated for MuchMusic's Video of the Year. A Soap Bubble and Inertia entered the Canadian album charts at No. 51 in July 1994 and peaked at No. 39 on August 1, 1994.

In 1995, they released their second album Kicking in the Water, and shortly after were signed by major label MCA Records. Their 1997 release, Sold for a Smile, included the singles "Downtime" and "Watching the Girl".  All three albums were also released in Japan on the label Avex DD.

Though Sold for a Smile was a minor commercial success (with the "Downtime" video receiving substantial play at MuchMusic), the album would be the band's last, as the grunge/alternative movement of the 1990s faded in popularity. They would announce their breakup in 2000.

Following the break-up of the band, Beau Cook returned to his former band, Smoother. Vocalist Paul Jago became a geologist and moved to Arizona, later forming the band (duo with wife) SAID DOG.

Band members
 Final line-up
Paul Jago – vocals (1989–2000)
Jud Ruhl – guitar (1989–2000)
Brian Ward – guitar (1989–2000)
Beau Cook – bass, keyboards (1996–2000)
Tim McDonald – drums (1989–2000)

Former members
Rob Blanchette – bass (1989–1993)
Eric Howden – bass (1993–1996)

Discography

The Droogs
The Droogs – 1991

Gandharvas
A Soap Bubble and Inertia (1994)
Kicking in the Water (1995)
Sold for a Smile (1997)

References

External links
The Gandharvas on Myspace
The Droogs at the CHRW-FM London Music Archives
A Soap Bubble and Inertia at the CHRW-FM London Music Archives

Musical groups established in 1989
Musical groups disestablished in 2000
Musical groups from London, Ontario
Canadian alternative rock groups
1989 establishments in Ontario
2000 disestablishments in Ontario